Al-Mandhar Rabia Said Al-Alawi (born 31 March 1995) is an Omani professional footballer who plays as a midfielder for Omani club Dhofar and the Omani national team.

International career
He debuted internationally in his youth team with the Oman U-19 in a 6–0 defeat against Iraq in the 2014 AFC U-19 Championship in Myanmar.

He also appeared in the U-23 team against China in a 3–0 defeat at the 2018 AFC U-23 Championship in China.

In 5 September 2019, Al-Alawi made his senior debut and scored his first 2 goals for Oman against India in 1–2 victory of the 2022 FIFA World Cup qualification.

International goals
Scores and results list Oman's goal tally first.

References

External links
 
 

1995 births
Living people
Omani footballers
Dhofar Club players
Oman international footballers
Association football midfielders
People from Ash Sharqiyah South Governorate